The 2000 Pukapuka-Nassau by-election was a by-election in the Cook Islands electorate of Pukapuka-Nassau. It took place on 28 September 2000.

The by-election was caused by the invalidation of the 1999 Pukapuka-Nassau by-election. The Cook Islands Parliament subsequently passed an Electoral Amendment Act providing for a second by-election and the re-registration of voters in the electorate. The election was contested by two candidates, and won by the Democratic Alliance Party's Tiaki Wuatai.

References

By-elections in the Cook Islands
2000 elections in Oceania
2000 in the Cook Islands